National Highway 124C, commonly referred to as NH 124C is a national highway in India. It is a secondary route of National Highway 24.  NH-124C runs in the states of Uttar Pradesh and Bihar in India.

Route 
NH124C connects Tarighat, Gahmar,Bara and Buxar in the states of Uttar Pradesh and Bihar.

Junctions  

  Terminal near Tarighat.
  Terminal near Buxar.

See also 
 List of National Highways in India
 List of National Highways in India by state

References

External links 

 NH 124C on OpenStreetMap

National highways in India
National Highways in Uttar Pradesh
National Highways in Bihar